Richfield is a village in Washington County, Wisconsin, United States. The population was 11,739 at the 2020 census. The previously unincorporated communities of Hubertus and Pleasant Hill are located in the village, as well as the communities of Colgate and Lake Five, which are partially located in Richfield.

History
The Richfield area was originally inhabited by Native Americans, including the Menominee and Potawatomi peoples. In 1831, The Menominee surrendered their claims to the land to the United States Federal Government through the Treaty of Washington, and the Potawatomi surrendered claims in 1833 through the 1833 Treaty of Chicago, which (after being ratified in 1835) required them to leave the area by 1838. While many Native people moved west of the Mississippi River to Kansas, some chose to remain, and were referred to as "strolling Potawatomi" in contemporary documents because many of them were migrants who subsisted by squatting on their ancestral lands, which were now owned by white settlers. Eventually, the Potawatomi who evaded forced removal gathered in northern Wisconsin, where they formed the Forest County Potawatomi Community.

On May 31, 1841, a land speculator named Samuel Spivey purchased 600 acres of land in the Richfield, becoming the first white landowner in the Richfield area and marking the beginning of early settlement. Several weeks later, on July 9, 1841, Jacob Snyder purchased land in the area and settled in Richfield, becoming the first white permanent resident. By 1843, German immigrants − particularly from Hesse-Darmstadt − were building farms in the area, and the community began to form. A group of German Catholics built the community's first church in 1845 and dedicated it to Saint Hubertus. Today, the community that formed around the church also bears the saint's name.

The Town of Richfield was organized on January 21, 1846, and by 1848 almost all of the town's land was owned by Irish and German immigrant farmers. Wheat farming dominated the local economy until 1880, when dairy farming became more popular in Richfield and the state at large.

The La Crosse and Milwaukee Railroad was constructed through the community in 1855, and while it initially led to local economic growth, the company failed in 1861. Many local landowners had taken out mortgages on land for the railroad in exchange for company shares. The company's failure left the landowners with mortgages to pay off, creating a local crisis in which some families were forced to sell their farms.

In the early 20th century, camps and other recreational facilities began to spring up on the shores of the numerous kettle lakes in Richfield, including YMCA Camp Minikani on Lake Amy Belle, which was founded in 1919.

The town was primarily agricultural until the 1970s when suburbanization led to increased real estate development and a decline in farming. On November 6, 2007, voters approved the town's incorporation as the Village of Richfield by a margin of 3 to 1. The town became a village on February 13, 2008.

Geography
The low point in the village lies in Section 1 at Little Cedar Creek with an elevation of 856 feet.  The high point in the village lies in Section 19 in the Cul-de-sac of Cheyenne Court at an elevation of 1,174 feet. (Washington County, Wi 2foot topography)

Recreation
The village of Richfield has 6 lakes and the largest one is Friess Lake. Other lakes include Amy Belle, Bark Lake, Lake Five, Little Friess, and Mud Lake. YMCA Camp Minikani is located on the shore of Lake Amy Belle in the Hubertus area of the village.

Demographics

2010 census
As of the census of 2010, there were 11,300 people, 4,170 households, and 3,465 families living in the village. The racial makeup of the village was 96.9% White, 0.8% African American, 0.3% Native American, 1.1% Asian, 0.4% from other races, and 0.5% from two or more races. Hispanic or Latino of any race were 1.4% of the population.

There were 4,170 households, of which 34.1% had children under the age of 18 living with them, 75.6% were married couples living together, 4.1% had a female householder with no husband present, 3.3% had a male householder with no wife present, and 16.9% were non-families. 13.7% of all households were made up of individuals, and 5.2% had someone living alone who was 65 years of age or older. The average household size was 2.71 and the average family size was 2.99.

The median age in the village was 45 years. 23.9% of residents were under the age of 18; 5.9% were between the ages of 18 and 24; 20.3% were from 25 to 44; 37.5% were from 45 to 64; and 12.5% were 65 years of age or older. The gender makeup of the village was 51.1% male and 48.9% female.

2000 census
As of the census of 2000, there were 10,373 people, 3,614 households, and 3,111 families living in the town.  The population density was 289.2 people per square mile (111.7/km2).  There were 3,766 housing units at an average density of 105.0 per square mile (40.5/km2).  The racial makeup of the village  was 98.28% White, 0.23% African American, 0.04% Native American, 0.67% Asian, 0.07% Pacific Islander, 0.11% from other races, and 0.61% from two or more races. Hispanic or Latino of any race were 0.70% of the population.

There were 3,614 households, out of which 38.7% had children under the age of 18 living with them, 78.7% were married couples living together, 4.3% had a female householder with no husband present, and 13.9% were non-families. 11.0% of all households were made up of individuals, and 3.3% had someone living alone who was 65 years of age or older.  The average household size was 2.87 and the average family size was 3.10.

In the village the population was spread out, with 26.6% under the age of 18, 6.1% from 18 to 24, 29.1% from 25 to 44, 30.1% from 45 to 64, and 8.1% who were 65 years of age or older.  The median age was 39 years. For every 100 females, there were 106.6 males.  For every 100 females age 18 and over, there were 104.6 males.

The median income for a household in the village was $72,809, and the median income for a family was $77,572. Males had a median income of $52,048 versus $31,156 for females. The per capita income for the village was $29,859.  About 1.1% of families and 1.3% of the population were below the poverty line, including 0.4% of those under age 18 and 3.7% of those age 65 or over.

Education

Richfield is served by both the Holy Hill Area School District and the Germantown School District. The Holy Hill Area School District consists of Friess Lake Elementary School and Richfield Middle School. The district is part of the Hartford Union High School District. Amy Belle Elementary School is located in the southeast portion of the village, and that is part of the Germantown School District.

Transportation
The Riteway Bus Service has their headquarters in Richfield.

Notable residents
Josh Bilicki, racing driver

References

External links
Village of Richfield

Villages in Washington County, Wisconsin
Villages in Wisconsin